Doraegopis is a genus of gastropods belonging to the family Zonitidae.

The species of this genus are found in Greece.

Species:

Doraegopis boeoticus 
Doraegopis carinatus 
Doraegopis euboeicus 
Doraegopis parnonicus 
Doraegopis subaii

References

Zonitidae